John King  was an Anglican priest in Ireland during the late eighteenth and early nineteenth centuries.

The second son of Admiral Edward Durnford King, he was  educated at Trinity College, Dublin. He was Vicar general of the Diocese of Tuam, Killala and Achonry from 1790 to 1799; and Archdeacon of Killala  from 1799 until his death in 1818.

Notes

Alumni of Trinity College Dublin
18th-century Irish Anglican priests
19th-century Irish Anglican priests
1818 deaths
Archdeacons of Killala